Universal TV is a television channel in New Zealand available on Sky. The channel is dedicated to international crime and drama procedural programing.

History
On 6 April 2021, Sky announced it had signed an extensive multi-year deal with NBCUniversal to launch a New Zealand version of Universal TV.

The channel launched on 30 April 2021 at 6:00am on Sky Channel 210. The first program to air on the channel was Monk.

Programming
Universal TV currently airs a variety of international programs, including:
 Chicago P.D.
 Chicago Fire
 Chicago Med
 House 
 Law & Order: Criminal Intent
 Law & Order: Special Victims Unit
 Monk

See also
 Universal TV
 Universal Networks International

References

External links

Television channels in New Zealand
U
Television channels and stations established in 2021